Colômbia is a municipality in the northern part of the state of São Paulo in Brazil. The population is 6,216 (2020 est.) in an area of 728.65 km². The elevation is 492 m. The bounding municipalities are Barretos to the south and Guaíra to the east. To the north, on the other side of the Rio Grande, is the state of Minas Gerais and the municipality of Planura.

References

External links
  http://www.colombia.sp.gov.br
  citybrazil.com.br

Municipalities in São Paulo (state)